O Quinto dos Infernos is a 2002 Brazilian historical comedy television miniseries. It was written by Carlos Lombardi, and directed by Wolf Maya and 48 episodes were produced. The protagonist was Marcos Pasquim.

Cast
 Marcos Pasquim - D. Pedro I
 Luana Piovani - Domitila de Castro Canto e Melo
 Humberto Martins - Francisco Gomes,  "Chalaça"
 Betty Lago - Carlota Joaquina
 André Mattos - D. João VI
 Danielle Winits - Manuela
 Bruna Lombardi - Branca
 Caco Ciocler - D. Miguel
 Cláudia Abreu - Amélia de Leuchtemberg
 Nair Bello - Giovanna/Marquesa di Pesto
 Eva Wilma - D. Maria I
 José Wilker - Marquês de Marialva
 Lima Duarte - Conde dos Arcos
 Érika Evantini - Imperatriz Leopoldina
 Pedro Paulo Rangel - Camargo
 Paulo Goulart - José Bonifácio
 Carolina Ferraz - Naomi
 Nathalia Timberg - Xuxu
 John Herbert - Lobato
 Maria Padilha - Emengarda Cauper
 Flávio Galvão - Cauper
 Roger Gobeth - Plácido
 Taís Araújo - Dandara
 Ana Furtado - D. Maria Teresa
 Bruno Garcia - Carlos
 Carlos Bonow - Gastão
 Françoise Forton - Miou-Miou
 Nuno Leal Maia - Coronel João de Castro Canto e Melo, Visconde de Castro
 Mauro Mendonça - Arcebispo Melo
 Mário Gomes - Marquês de Barbacena
 Geraldo Pestalozzi - Nolasco
 Henri Castelli - Augusto
 Diogo Morgado - Dom Carlos
 Joana Limaverde - Benedita
 Gabriel Braga Nunes - Felício
 Bettina Vianny - Escolástica
 Mário Frias - Manuelzinho
 Licurgo Spínola - Fernão
 Vanessa Lóes - Mariana
 Mila Moreira - Inês
 Rachel Nunes - Lalá
 Maria Maya - Lelé
 Carolina Galvão - Lili
 Carlos Gregório - Rodrigo
 Antônio Grassi - Capitão Vidigal
 Othon Bastos - Soares
 Cláudia Lyra - Rita
 Ângelo Paes Leme - Emanuel
 Odilon Wagner - Ernesto
 Tamara Taxman - Augusta
 Miguel Thiré - Augusto
 Jonas Bloch - Francisco I
 Cláudia Alencar - Amapola
 Adriana Garambone - Luísa
 Edwin Luisi - Saucer
 Marilu Bueno - Violante
 Oswaldo Louzada - Alencastro
 Mônica Torres - Kate
 Marcos Breda - Frei
 Roberto Bomtempo - Sardinha
 Camilo Bevilacqua - Comandante Manuel Morais
 Cecília Dassi - Princesa Maria da Glória
 Walter Breda - Arcoverde
 Thaís de Campos - Arminda
 Geórgia Gomide - Aurora
 Helena Fernandes - Chiquinha
 Luís Guilherme - Conde de Bagaceira
 Dartagnan Jr. - Amigo de Chalaça
 Paulo Gorgulho - Juvêncio
 Débora Duarte - Amália
 Caio Junqueira - Diogo
 Carlos Thiré - Eduardo
 Juliana Silveira - Rosaura
 Jonathan Nogueira - Guarda
 Maria Cristina Gatti - Dona da pousada
 Monah Delacy - Madre Superiora
 Tatiana Issa - Urbana
 Pia Manfroni - Carmem
 Vanessa Machado - Eugênia
 Catarina Abdalla
 Eduardo Conde - Desoausex
 Fábio Junqueira - Avelar
 José Carlos Sanches

External links

2002 Brazilian television series debuts
Rede Globo original programming
Brazilian comedy television series
Portuguese-language television shows
Pedro I of Brazil
John VI of Portugal
Television series based on actual events